Weston M. Hicks (born 1957) is a business executive in the finance industry known to be the director and president of Alleghany Corporation and director of AllianceBernstein.

Current executive roles 
Hicks became chief executive officer, director and president at Alleghany Corporation at the end of 2004. In July 2005, he became a director of AllianceBernstein, AllianceBernstein Corporation and Alliancebernstein Holding. Seven years later, he was appointed a director of Transatlantic Holdings.

On taking on his current appointment and resigning from as chief financial officer of the Chubb Corporation, Hicks said: “Chubb is a first-class company in all respects, and I have enjoyed working there.  But I wanted to take advantage of this once-in-a-lifetime opportunity to move to a senior leadership position closely related to the world of investing, in which I have spent most of my career.”

Societies
Hicks is a member of the New York Society of Securities Analysts, the CFA Institute, on the board of directors of AllianceBernstein Holding, and a past president of the Association of Insurance and Financial Analysts.

Finances
On 1 February 2012, Hicks sold 3,219 shares at an average price of $295.44 a share. On 27 October 2014, he sold AllianceBernstein stock for $129,100. His total compensation for the 2014 fiscal year was $10,543,046.

Employment history
Prior to his current role at Alleghany Corporation, he was the firm’s executive vice president.  Before joining the firm, Hicks worked at Schb as a senior research analyst. Other key executive roles he has had include the Chubb Corporation (chief financial officer and executive vice president) JP Morgan Chase (equity analyst), JP Morgan Securities (senior research analyst) Sanford C. Bernstein & Co. (equity analyst), Moody’s Investor’s Service (associate director), Bank of America (commercial banker). He was also a director of Darwin Professional Underwriters between 2003 and 2008.

Education
Hicks has a B.S. summa cum laude in business and economics from Lehigh University. While at the university, he was elected Phi Beta Kappa. In addition, he held the recognition of certified public accountant until converting to inactive status following his career in public accounting.

Acclaim
Dean R. O’Hare, chief executive officer and chairman of Chubb said, “Weston has been a great asset to Chubb.  We are sorry to see him leave, and we wish him the best in his exciting new venture.”

Jay Adam Cohen, BofA Merrill Lynch, described him as being “very, very tough competition. He was a great sell side insurance analyst. He's been a really good CEO as well.”

References

American businesspeople
1957 births
Living people